Jerry Chamberlain is an American singer, songwriter, guitarist, and producer, best known for his work with the rock bands Daniel Amos and the Swirling Eddies (credited as "Spot").

In late 1974, Chamberlain was asked to join Jubal's Last Band, a band that consisted of Terry Scott Taylor, Steve Baxter and bassist Kenny Paxton. Marty Dieckmeyer was soon brought in as a replacement for the departing Paxton. Sometime in the middle of 1975, Jubal's Last Band or Jubal (as a shortened form of the name was briefly used) auditioned for Maranatha! Music and Calvary Chapel (without Baxter, who couldn't get off work) in hopes of signing a recording and performance contract. At a Maranatha Music meeting, another band led by Darrell Mansfield, was
also using the name, Jubal. The two bands decided to change their names to avoid confusion. Mansfield renamed his band Gentle Faith, and Jubal's Last Band/Jubal became Daniel Amos.

Daniel Amos succeeded in landing a recording and performance contract, and quickly recorded their first song for the label, Taylor's "Ain't Gonna Fight It" for the Maranatha 5 compilation. A full album, produced by Al Perkins, followed. Chamberlain quickly became an important part in the sound of D.A. In the band's early days of country/rock, Chamberlain would often launch into a rock and roll guitar solo inappropriately in the middle of "Happily Married Man." In the later years, his guitar playing drove songs like "Endless Summer" and "I Love You #19".

Although Chamberlain left DA in late 1983, he did return on a few later albums including MotorCycle (1993) (which he co-produced), BibleLand (1994) and Songs of the Heart (1995).

In 2001, Chamberlain and Sharon McCall recorded a song ("Message from the Country") with pop rocker Doug Powell, drummer Ken Coomer (Wilco, Uncle Tupelo) and session musician Jonathan Yudkin for the Jeff Lynne tribute Lynne Me Your Ears (2002) under the moniker, The Balls of France.

The years 2004–2005 saw Chamberlain and McCall join forces with friends to form an all-British Invasion outfit called The Pickled Beats. The band continues, with slight lineup changes, to play the occasional live performance.

In 2006, Chamberlain once again joined forces with Terry Taylor by lending a hand on the Lost Dogs album The Lost Cabin and the Mystery Trees. Chamberlain also returned to his Swirling Eddies pseudonym "Spot," for the 2007 release The midget, the speck and the molecule.

After meeting and doing gigs together over 30 years ago in California, Chamberlain and Pam Mark Hall joined forces as the duo, Pamelita and Parker, in late 2008.

External links
 Jerry Chamberlain's MySpace Music Page
 Jerry Chamberlain's MySpace Personal Page
 Follow Jerry Chamberlain on Twitter
 The Official Website of Pamelita & Parker (Pam Mark Hall & Jerry Chamberlain)

Living people
American rock guitarists
American male guitarists
American rock singers
American male singers
American male songwriters
American male composers
20th-century American composers
Singers from Nashville, Tennessee
1952 births
Songwriters from Tennessee
Guitarists from Tennessee
20th-century American guitarists
The Swirling Eddies members
Daniel Amos members
20th-century American male musicians